Katto is a Pakistani television soap opera produced by Six Sigma Plus Production, written by Zoha Hassan, and directed by Shahid Aziz. The lead role of Katto is played by Almas Fidai, a new actress to Pakistani television. The first episode aired 21 March 2018 on ARY Digital.

Plot
Katto revolves around the ambitions of a young woman, Farzana Mustaqeem, also referred to as Katto, who falls in love with actor Humayun Saeed.  Her love and dream of marrying Saeed motivates her to pursue a job in media, all the while knowing it's a dream that can never come true because she belongs to a middle class family, and unwillingly marries Imran (manjhala).

Cast
Almas Fidai
Asad Mehmood
Imran Bukhari
Shahzad Raza

Awards and nominations

References

2018 Pakistani television series debuts
ARY Digital original programming